Ben Ladd-Gibbon (born 20 May 1994) is an English cricketer. He made his first-class debut on 28 March 2017 for Loughborough MCCU against Leicestershire as part of the Marylebone Cricket Club University fixtures.

References

External links
 

1994 births
Living people
English cricketers
Loughborough MCCU cricketers
Sportspeople from Dorchester, Dorset
Cricketers from Dorset
Dorset cricketers